Urum is a Turkic language spoken by several thousand ethnic Greeks who inhabit a few villages in Georgia and southeastern Ukraine. Over the past few generations, there has been a deviation from teaching children Urum to the more common languages of the region, leaving a fairly limited number of new speakers. The Urum language is often considered a variant of Crimean Tatar.

Name and etymology 
The name Urum is derived from Rûm ("Rome"), the term for the Byzantine Empire in the Muslim world. The Ottoman Empire used it to describe non-Muslims within the empire. The initial vowel in Urum is prosthetic. Turkic languages originally did not have  in the word-initial position and so in borrowed words, it used to add a vowel before it. The common use of the term Urum appears to have led to some confusion, as most Turkish-speaking Greeks were called Urum. The Turkish-speaking population in Georgia is often confused with the distinct community in Ukraine.

Classification 
Urum is a Turkic language belonging to the Kipchak branch of the family. According to Glottolog, Urum is a West Kipchak language and forms a subfamily with the Crimeaic languages (Crimean Tatar and Krymchak).

Phonology

Vowels

Examples 

  - city
  - hand
  - lake
  - wind
  - road
  - dog
  - ring
  - girl
  - bird

Consonants

/θ, ð/ appear solely in loanwords from Greek. /t͡s/ appears in loanwords. [w] can be an allophone of /v/ after vowels.

Writing system
A few manuscripts are known to be written in Urum using Greek characters. During the period between 1927 and 1937, the Urum language was written in reformed Latin characters, the New Turkic Alphabet, and used in local schools; at least one primer is known to have been printed. In 1937, the use of written Urum stopped. Alexander Garkavets uses the following alphabet:

In an Urum primer issued in Kyiv in 2008, the following alphabet is suggested:

Publications
Very little has been published on the Urum language. There exists a very small lexicon, and a small description of the language.
For Caucasian Urum, there is a language documentation project that collected a dictionary, a set of grammatically relevant clausal constructions, and a text corpus. The website of the project contains issues about language and history.

References

External links
 Urum DoReCo corpus compiled by Stavros Skopeteas, Violeta Moisidi, Nutsa Tsetereli, Johanna Lorenz and Stefanie Schröter. Audio recordings of narrative texts with transcriptions time-aligned at the phone level, translations, and time-aligned morphological annotations.

Agglutinative languages
Kipchak languages
Pontic Greeks
Languages of Ukraine
Pontic Greek culture
Turkic languages